Nothobranchius jubbi is a species of killifish in the family Nothobranchiidae. It occurs in north eastern Africa in Kenya, Somalia and Ethiopia in temporary pools, ditches, marshes and rain pans, normally ones without any connections to rivers. This species was described in 1979 by Rudolf Hans Wildekamp and Heinz Otto Berkenkamp with the type locality given as a pool on the road to Garsen, 17 miles north of Malindi. The specific name honours the South African meteorologist and ichthyologist Reginald A. “Rex” Jubb (1905-1987) of the Freshwater Fish Section at the  Albany Museum in Grahamstown, South Africa, in recognition of his taxonomic work on the genus Nothobranchius.

References

Links
 Nothobranchius jubbi on WildNothos 

Taxa named by Rudolf Hans Wildekamp
Taxa named by Heinz Otto Berkenkamp 
Fish described in 1979
jubbi
Taxonomy articles created by Polbot